Vinan Gopinathan Nair (born 19 November 1975) is a former Indian cricketer who played first-class cricket for Kerala. He is a right-handed middle order batsman and wicketkeeper.

References

External links
 

Indian cricketers
Kerala cricketers
1975 births
Living people
Cricketers from Kerala
21st-century Indian people